This is a list of municipalities in Lithuania which have standing links to local communities in other countries known as "town twinning" (usually in Europe) or "sister cities" (usually in the rest of the world).

A
Akmenė

 Auce, Latvia

 Dobele, Latvia
 Kalundborg, Denmark
 Konin, Poland
 Mariupol, Ukraine
 Mukawa, Japan
 Ölfus, Iceland
 Rustavi, Georgia
 Santa Susanna, Spain
 Shostka, Ukraine
 Skhidnytsia, Ukraine
 Ungheni, Moldova
 Viru-Nigula, Estonia

Alytus

 Amata, Latvia
 Berdychiv, Ukraine
 Botkyrka, Sweden
 Ełk, Poland
 General San Martín, Argentina
 Giżycko County, Poland
 Kremenchuk, Ukraine
 Næstved, Denmark
 Opole, Poland
 Ostrołęka, Poland
 Rochester, United States
 Suwałki, Poland
 Vélizy-Villacoublay, France

Anykščiai

 Aglona, Latvia
 Dalaman, Turkey
 Dobele, Latvia
 Krupina, Slovakia
 Madona, Latvia
 Myrhorod, Ukraine
 Nepomuk, Czech Republic
 Ödeshög, Sweden
 Os, Norway
 Sassenage, France
 Sejny, Poland
 Telavi, Georgia
 Uniejów, Poland
 Vasylkiv, Ukraine

B
Birštonas

 Ağstafa, Azerbaijan
 Bykle, Norway
 Chiatura, Georgia
 La Croix-en-Touraine, France
 Ełk County, Poland

 Keila, Estonia
 Leck, Germany
 Lipik, Croatia
 Sigulda, Latvia
 Sysmä, Finland
 Żnin, Poland

Biržai

 Aizkraukle, Latvia
 Bauska, Latvia
 Grodzisk Wielkopolski, Poland
 Tczew, Poland
 Vecumnieki, Latvia
 Werder, Germany

D
Druskininkai

 Augustów, Poland
 Elbląg, Poland
 Strzelce Opolskie, Poland

E
Elektrėnai

 Bruck an der Leitha District, Austria
 Forlì, Italy
 Maardu, Estonia
 Nowy Dwór Mazowiecki, Poland

 Zhovkva Raion, Ukraine

I
Ignalina

 Büren, Germany
 Østfold, Norway
 Prachatice, Czech Republic
 Serock, Poland

J
Jonava

 Děčín, Czech Republic
 Jõgeva, Estonia
 Kędzierzyn-Koźle, Poland
 Riihimäki, Finland
 Pucioasa, Romania
 Smila, Ukraine
 Vadul lui Vodă, Moldova
 Zugdidi, Georgia

Joniškis

 Alūksne, Latvia
 Auce, Latvia
 Dobele, Latvia
 Jelgava Municipality, Latvia
 Konin, Poland
 Novoselytsia, Ukraine
 Sulingen, Germany
 Ungheni, Moldova
 Vimmerby, Sweden
 Võru, Estonia

Joniškis – Žagarė is a member of the Charter of European Rural Communities, a town twinning association across the European Union, alongside with:

 Bienvenida, Spain
 Bièvre, Belgium
 Bucine, Italy
 Cashel, Ireland
 Cissé, France
 Desborough, England, United Kingdom
 Esch (Haaren), Netherlands
 Hepstedt, Germany
 Ibănești, Romania
 Kandava (Tukums), Latvia
 Kannus, Finland
 Kolindros, Greece
 Lassee, Austria
 Medzev, Slovakia
 Moravče, Slovenia
 Næstved, Denmark
 Nagycenk, Hungary
 Nadur, Malta
 Ockelbo, Sweden
 Pano Lefkara, Cyprus
 Põlva, Estonia
 Samuel (Soure), Portugal
 Slivo Pole, Bulgaria
 Starý Poddvorov, Czech Republic
 Strzyżów, Poland
 Tisno, Croatia
 Troisvierges, Luxembourg

Jurbarkas

 Crailsheim, Germany
 Criuleni, Moldova
 Hajnówka, Poland
 Laakdal, Belgium
 Lichtenberg (Berlin), Germany
 Ryn, Poland

K
Kaišiadorys

 Będzin, Poland
 Hola Prystan, Ukraine
 Jõgeva, Estonia
 Twistringen, Germany

Kaunas

 Białystok, Poland
 Brno, Czech Republic
 Cava de' Tirreni, Italy
 Grenoble, France
 Kharkiv, Ukraine
 Linköping, Sweden
 Lippe (district), Germany
 Los Angeles, United States
 Lutsk, Ukraine
 Lviv Oblast, Ukraine
 Myślibórz, Poland
 Odense, Denmark
 Rende, Italy
 Rishon LeZion, Israel
 San Martín, Argentina
 Tampere, Finland
 Tartu, Estonia
 Toruń, Poland
 Växjö, Sweden
 Vestfold og Telemark, Norway
 Vestland, Norway
 Wrocław, Poland
 Xiamen, China
 Yaotsu, Japan

Kazlų Rūda

 Frombork, Poland
 Gołdap County, Poland

 Koriukivka, Ukraine
 Lwówek, Poland
 Masty, Belarus
 Olecko, Poland
 Oni, Georgia
 Sondershausen, Germany

Kėdainiai

 Brodnica, Poland
 Fălticeni, Romania
 Kohtla-Järve, Estonia
 Łobez, Poland
 Melitopol, Ukraine
 Sömmerda, Germany
 Svalöv, Sweden
 Telavi, Georgia

Kelmė

 Biłgoraj, Poland
 Gallese, Italy
 Hódmezővásárhely, Hungary
 Kinn, Norway
 Lienen, Germany
 Miastko, Poland
 Novovolynsk, Ukraine
 Ogre, Latvia
 Östra Göinge, Sweden
 Sankt Veit an der Glan, Austria
 Świętajno, Poland
 Wartburg (district), Germany

Klaipėda

 Cleveland, United States
 Debrecen, Hungary
 Gdynia, Poland
 Karlskrona, Sweden
 Kotka, Finland
 Kuji, Japan
 Liepāja, Latvia
 Lübeck, Germany
 Mannheim, Germany
 Mersin, Turkey
 North Tyneside, England, United Kingdom

 Sassnitz, Germany
 Szczecin, Poland

Klaipėda District Municipality

 Iława, Poland
 Maardu, Estonia

Kretinga

 Blankenfelde-Mahlow, Germany
 Bornholm, Denmark
 Gribskov, Denmark
 Märkisch-Oderland (district), Germany
 Osby, Sweden
 Viljandi, Estonia

Kupiškis

 Balvi, Latvia
 Jēkabpils, Latvia
 Kežmarok, Slovakia
 Lanchkhuti, Georgia
 Manevychi Raion, Ukraine
 Rēzekne Municipality, Latvia
 Sztum, Poland
 Zgierz, Poland

L
Lazdijai

 Ambrolauri, Georgia
 Augustów County, Poland
 Baranivka, Ukraine
 Holmestrand, Norway
 Łuków, Poland
 Płaska, Poland
 Puńsk, Poland
 Sejny, Poland
 Tomelilla, Sweden
 Tõrva, Estonia
 Wieleń, Poland

M
Marijampolė

 Bergisch Gladbach, Germany
 Kokkola, Finland
 Kvam, Norway
 Lesja, Norway
 Mayo, Ireland
 Piotrków Trybunalski, Poland
 Reșița, Romania
 Rogoźno, Poland
 Suwałki, Poland
 Suwałki (rural gmina), Poland
 Valga, Estonia
 Valka, Latvia
 Viborg, Denmark

Mažeikiai

 Havelberg, Germany
 Havířov, Czech Republic
 Lebedyn, Ukraine

 Paide, Estonia
 Płock, Poland
 Saldus, Latvia

Molėtai

 Chkhorotsqu, Georgia
 Hörstel, Germany
 Ludza, Latvia
 Maków, Poland
 Romaniv Raion, Ukraine
 Ungheni, Moldova

N
Neringa

 Fehmarn, Germany
 Jaunjelgava, Latvia
 Łeba, Poland

 Pāvilosta, Latvia
 Saulkrasti, Latvia
 Zelenogradsk, Russia

P
Pagėgiai

 Bad Iburg, Germany
 Iława (rural gmina), Poland
 Kose, Estonia
 Lomma, Sweden
 Zbarazh Raion, Ukraine

Pakruojis

 Bauska, Latvia
 Gurjaani, Georgia
 Põhja-Pärnumaa, Estonia
 Kozłowo, Poland
 Mariestad, Sweden
 Raunheim, Germany
 Rundāle, Latvia
 Rypin, Poland
 Uggiate-Trevano, Italy

Palanga

 Bergen auf Rügen, Germany
 Bucha, Ukraine
 Eilat, Israel
 Jūrmala, Latvia
 Kobuleti, Georgia
 Liepāja, Latvia
 Simrishamn, Sweden
 Ustka, Poland

Panevėžys

 Daugavpils, Latvia
 Gabrovo, Bulgaria
 Goes, Netherlands
 Kalmar, Sweden
 Kolding, Denmark
 Lublin, Poland
 Lünen, Germany
 Maramureș County, Romania
 Rakvere, Estonia
 Ramla, Israel
 Rustavi, Georgia
 Toyohashi, Japan
 Vinnytsia, Ukraine

Panevėžys District Municipality

 Akhmeta, Georgia

 het Bildt (Waadhoeke), Netherlands
 Ialoveni District, Moldova
 Limbaži, Latvia
 Lubicz, Poland
 Maramureș County, Romania
 Vinni, Estonia

Pasvalys

 Bauska, Latvia
 Chokhatauri, Georgia
 Drangedal, Norway
 Götene, Sweden
 Iecava, Latvia
 Liévin, France
 Liubar Raion, Ukraine
 Obernkirchen, Germany
 Żory, Poland

Plungė

 Bjerkreim, Norway
 Boxholm, Sweden
 Bruntál, Czech Republic
 Golub-Dobrzyń, Poland

 Kvareli, Georgia
 Menden, Germany
 Tukums, Latvia

Prienai

 Asikkala, Finland
 Bitetto, Italy
 Busk, Ukraine
 Dusheti, Georgia
 Kętrzyn (rural gmina), Poland
 Lubań, Poland
 Parczew, Poland
 Talsi, Latvia

 Türi, Estonia

R
Radviliškis

 Bauska, Latvia
 Daliyat al-Karmel, Israel
 Gniezno, Poland
 Grodzisk Mazowiecki, Poland
 Kadzidło, Poland
 Khashuri, Georgia
 Saint-Seine-l'Abbaye, France
 Skara, Sweden
 Uman, Ukraine

Raseiniai

 Ķekava, Latvia
 Lubartów, Poland
 Mława, Poland
 Ourém, Portugal
 Rapla, Estonia
 Zhmerynka Raion, Ukraine

Rietavas

 Gulbene, Latvia
 Kętrzyn (rural gmina), Poland
 Saerbeck, Germany

Rokiškis is a member of the Douzelage, a town twinning association of towns across the European Union. Rokiškis also has several other twin towns.

Douzelage
 Agros, Cyprus
 Altea, Spain
 Asikkala, Finland
 Bad Kötzting, Germany
 Bellagio, Italy
 Bundoran, Ireland
 Chojna, Poland
 Granville, France
 Holstebro, Denmark
 Houffalize, Belgium
 Judenburg, Austria
 Kőszeg, Hungary
 Marsaskala, Malta
 Meerssen, Netherlands
 Niederanven, Luxembourg
 Oxelösund, Sweden
 Preveza, Greece
 Rovinj, Croatia
 Sesimbra, Portugal
 Sherborne, England, United Kingdom
 Sigulda, Latvia
 Siret, Romania
 Škofja Loka, Slovenia
 Sušice, Czech Republic
 Tryavna, Bulgaria
 Türi, Estonia
 Zvolen, Slovakia
Other
 Borșa, Romania
 Cēsis, Latvia
 Daugavpils Municipality, Latvia
 Estenfeld, Germany
 Harbin, China
 Jēkabpils, Latvia
 Ludza, Latvia
 Ozurgeti, Georgia
 Pabianice, Poland
 Provadia, Bulgaria
 Tamsalu (Tapa), Estonia
 Viesīte, Latvia

S
Šalčininkai

 Arnage, France
 Bełchatów County, Poland
 Hude, Germany
 Kadzidło, Poland
 Kaźmierz, Poland
 Kętrzyn County, Poland
 Łowicz, Poland
 Nowe Miasto Lubawskie, Poland
 Płońsk, Poland
 Praga (Warsaw), Poland
 Stare Miasto, Poland
 Szczytno, Poland
 Tarnowo Podgórne, Poland
 Warsaw West County, Poland
 Wolsztyn County, Poland
 Wschowa, Poland
 Żnin, Poland
 Zviahel, Ukraine

Šiauliai

 Etten-Leur, Netherlands
 Fredericia, Denmark
 Jelgava, Latvia
 Khmelnytskyi, Ukraine
 Omaha, United States
 Pärnu, Estonia
 Plauen, Germany

Šilalė

 Borshchiv, Ukraine
 Kraśnik, Poland
 Lund, Norway
 Stavenhagen, Germany
 Tukums, Latvia

Šilutė

 Alanya, Turkey
 Cittaducale, Italy
 Emmerich am Rhein, Germany
 Gdańsk County, Poland
 Ljungby, Sweden
 Ostróda, Poland
 Ostróda (rural gmina), Poland
 Pruszcz Gdański, Poland
 Saldus, Latvia
 Skadovsk, Ukraine
 Tarutyne, Ukraine
 Vellinge, Sweden

Švenčionys

 Akkol District, Kazakhstah
 Mrągowo County, Poland
 Rumia, Poland
 Świdnica, Poland
 Virovitica-Podravina County, Croatia
 Wejherowo County, Poland
 Węgrów, Poland

T
Tauragė

 Bełchatów, Poland
 Bytów, Poland
 Považská Bystrica, Slovakia
 Riedstadt, Germany
 Ternopil, Ukraine
 Zestaponi, Georgia

Telšiai

 Bassum, Germany
 Krnov, Czech Republic
 Lebedyn, Ukraine
 Liezen, Austria
 Mestia, Georgia
 Mińsk Mazowiecki, Poland
 Obdach, Austria
 Saint-Égrève, France
 Sävsjö, Sweden
 Steinfurt (district), Germany

Trakai

 Acre, Israel
 Alanya, Turkey
 Avola, Italy
 Giżycko, Poland
 Giżycko (rural gmina), Poland
 Ivano-Frankivsk, Ukraine
 Koszalin, Poland
 Lutsk, Ukraine
 Malbork, Poland
 Mtskheta, Georgia
 Nowy Sącz, Poland
 Qazax, Azerbaijan
 Rheine, Germany
 Schönebeck, Germany
 Västra Götaland County, Sweden

U
Ukmergė

 Cologno al Serio, Italy
 Kamianets-Podilskyi, Ukraine
 Kiskunmajsa, Hungary
 Herrljunga, Sweden
 Līvāni, Latvia
 Põlva, Estonia
 Tarnowo Podgórne, Poland
 Tsalenjikha, Georgia
 Unstrut-Hainich (district), Germany
 Västra Götaland County, Sweden
 Wetterau (district), Germany
 Worcester, England, United Kingdom

Utena

 Beit Sahour, Palestine
 Chełm, Poland
 Hlybokaye, Belarus
 Kovel, Ukraine
 Lidköping, Sweden
 Pontinia, Italy
 Preiļi, Latvia
 Rēzekne, Latvia
 Třeboň, Czech Republic

V
Varėna

 Bartoszyce, Poland
 Ełk, Poland
 Giżycko, Poland
 Giżycko County, Poland
 Mikołajki, Poland
 Orzysz, Poland
 Prenzlau, Germany
 Szemud, Poland

Vilkaviškis

 Kowale Oleckie, Poland
 Marly, France
 Olecko, Poland
 Ruciane-Nida, Poland
 Suchowola, Poland

Vilnius

 Aalborg, Denmark
 Almaty, Kazakhstan
 Astana, Kazakhstan
 Chicago, United States
 Dnipro, Ukraine
 Donetsk, Ukraine
 Duisburg, Germany
 Erfurt, Germany
 Gdańsk, Poland
 Guangzhou, China
 Joensuu, Finland
 Kyiv, Ukraine
 Kraków, Poland
 Łódź, Poland
 Madison, United States
 Pavia, Italy
 Reykjavík, Iceland
 Riga, Latvia
 Salzburg, Austria
 Taipei, Taiwan
 Tallinn, Estonia
 Tbilisi, Georgia
 Warsaw, Poland

Vilnius District Municipality

 Białe Błota, Poland
 Birkenwerder, Germany
 Czarny Bór, Poland
 Dessau-Roßlau, Germany
 Dopiewo, Poland
 Komorniki, Poland
 Koronowo, Poland
 Knyszyn, Poland
 Krotoszyn, Poland
 Miłomłyn, Poland
 Międzyrzec Podlaski, Poland
 Olsztynek, Poland
 Pasym, Poland
 Poraj, Poland
 Radom, Poland
 Reda, Poland
 Rybnik, Poland
 Sambir, Ukraine
 Siedlce, Poland
 Sulejówek, Poland
 Węgorzewo, Poland
 Wysokie Mazowieckie, Poland

Visaginas

 Dagda, Latvia
 Daugavpils, Latvia
 Lidzbark Warmiński, Poland
 Slavutych, Ukraine
 Zambrów, Poland

Z
Zarasai

 Ballan-Miré, France
 Daugavpils Municipality, Latvia
 Jēkabpils, Latvia
 Mottafollone, Italy
 Senglea, Malta
 Zduńska Wola, Poland

References

Lithuania
Lithuanian culture-related lists
Lithuania geography-related lists
Foreign relations of Lithuania
Cities in Lithuania